Branksome Hall Asia is an independent educational institution located in Seogwipo, Jeju Province, South Korea. The institution opened in October 2012 and is the sister campus of the Canadian school Branksome Hall.

Overview
Branksome Hall Asia is co-educational international school starting from Junior Kindergarten Prep to Grade 5, and girls-only from Grade 6 to 12. The school claims to offers the same curriculum as Branksome Hall of Toronto. Branksome Hall of Toronto has an exchange program open to Grade 9 students to study and learn in South Korea. Branksome Hall Asia graduates can apply to universities in Korea as well as international post-secondary institutions.

History 
In 1903, Branksome Hall was started in Toronto, Canada. The first principal of Branksome Hall Toronto was Miss Margaret Scott, who served from 1903 to 1910. At first, it was started from rental property, but Branksome Hall's Toronto current campus has more than a dozen buildings. A new Sports Center and residence buildings are also currently under construction. In March 2009, Branksome Hall Toronto and the Korean government had a meeting about making a Branksome Hall campus in Jeju Global Education City, which is the UNESCO World Heritage listed island. During a ceremony held at the Branksome Hall Toronto campus, Branksome Hall signed a Cooperative Venture Agreement. After this, Branksome Hall Toronto began to plan and prepare for Branksome Hall Asia. By 2012, Branksome Hall Asia started in JeJu, Korea. Current Korean president, Suji Lee and Yehwon Jung, attended Branksome.

Curriculum 
IB (International Baccalaureate) ProgramProgram Contents
Primary Years Program: For students aged 3 to 12, focuses on the development of the whole child as an inquirer, both in the classroom and in the world outside.

Middle Years Program: For students aged 13 to 17, provides a framework of academic challenge that encourages students to embrace and understand the connections between traditional subjects and the real world. Students can become critical and reflective thinkers.

Diploma Program: For students aged 17 to 19, contents are academically challenging and balanced program of education with final examinations that prepares students for success at university and in life beyond.

Student exchange program
Branksome Advantage Exchange Program
As a part of the Branksome Hall Asia curriculum, Grade 9 students benefit from a study abroad experience.  

It is three weeks program in which Branksome Hall and Branksome Hall Asia collaborate through the exchange program.It starts in March and Branksome Hall students spend a week in Branksome Hall Asia Campus

Community involvement 
Branksome Hall Asia challenges the students to develop new skills, to learn more about themselves, and to make a difference in the communities in which they live and learn. The school believes that identity development deserves equal standing with intellectual development. Branksome Hall Asia delivers this focus, encouragement and an enabling set of experiences that provide a holistic education through the following.

Transformational learning 
The classrooms are a foundation for learning giving the students tools to build on. Hands-on learning experiences, where students construct meaning through active learning, solidify the concepts that are taught in the classroom.

Engagement 
Creativity, Action, Service, and Enrichment (C.A.S.E) activities support the academic endeavors and missions of the school. These activities and support systems are considered to be an integral part of school life. With over 70 options to choose from, students are given the means to enhance social interaction, leadership, healthy recreation, and self-confidence.

Global outlook 
Branksome Hall Asia focuses on the questions of perception rather than the specifics of geography or language by exploring multiple ways knowledge can be combined, comprehended and applied in our world.

Local and global community service 
Community Service Learning initiatives stem from the firm belief that the role of students extends beyond the classroom walls. Taking on the roles within community organizations as learn about various disparities locally and globally. As the school challenge the students to make a difference in the local and international communities in which they learn and live, these experiences enable crucial communication, organization, and teamwork skills.

Residence and facilities
Residence Program
The residence communal living experience provides a ‘Home away from Home’ for Branksome Hall Asia residents.

State-of-the-Art Facilities and Digital Learning Environment
Students at Branksome Hall Asia have access to the world’s best educational facilities which help support and develop their talents across all sports, arts and academic study. Such as STEM V Center (Science, Technology, Engineering, Math and Visual Art) and sports-related facilities.

Facilities 
Branksome Hall Asia is located in Jeju Island. Its campus is in the Jeju Global Education City (JGEC), a Jeju Free International City Development Center project with four different international schools. BHA was designed by Singaporean architect Phan Pit Li. The campus includes a Wellness Center that houses the cafeteria, the Olympic Aquatic Center, a hockey rink, a huge gymnasium with floor to ceiling windows, two yoga studios, an exercise room, and other recreational facilities. The classrooms have a large touch screen televisions and video cameras for students to study and review their lectures. The design and technology studios in BHA have 3D printers and other machines which don't exist in Korea. There are three cylinder shaped buildings for elementary, middle, and high school. The whole campus is connected through tunnels so that students can go from the tunnel even if the weather is bad. However, the only part of the building not connected to the tunnel is the Wellness Center. There are sport facilities such as 50m of swimming pool, tennis court, soccer pitch, golf driving range and putting green, wellness center, and hockey field to have athletics program. All BHA students have access to use these facilities. Also, there are performing art center for the art. The performing art center includes acoustically sophisticated auditorium, spacious classrooms, practice rooms, large recital room, black box theatres, TV studio, audio recording studio, and dance studio.

See also

 Jeju Free International City Development Center

References

External links
 

Girls' schools in South Korea
Boarding schools in South Korea
International schools in South Korea
International Baccalaureate schools in South Korea
Schools in Jeju Province
Educational institutions established in 2012
2012 establishments in South Korea